Nasser Essa Shafi Al-Shardan Al-Dawsari (born 19 December 1998) is a Saudi Arabian footballer who plays as a midfielder for Al Hilal.

Club career
On 23 November 2021, Al-Dawsari scored the fastest goal ever in the AFC Champions League, after just 16 seconds, propelling his side to a 2–0 victory over Pohang Steelers to secure a record fourth continental title for Al Hilal.

Career statistics

Club

International
Statistics accurate as of match played 26 November 2022

Honours
Al Hilal
 Saudi Professional League: 2017–18, 2019–20, 2020–21, 2021–22
 King Cup: 2019–20
 Saudi Super Cup: 2018, 2021
 AFC Champions League: 2019, 2021

Records
Fastest goal in the AFC Champions League Final: 2021 (16 seconds in against Pohang Steelers)

References

1998 births
Living people
Sportspeople from Riyadh
Saudi Arabian footballers
Saudi Arabia youth international footballers
Saudi Arabia international footballers
Association football midfielders
Al Hilal SFC players
Saudi Professional League players
2022 FIFA World Cup players